The Luweero–Butalangu Road is a road in the Central Region of Uganda, connecting the town of Luweero, the political headquarters of Luweero District, with the town of Butalangu, the political and administrative headquarters of Nakaseke District.

Location
The geographical coordinates of this road immediately west of downtown Kiwoko are:0°51'19.0"N,  32°20'27.0"E (Latitude:0.855278; Longitude:32.340833).

Upgrading to bitumen
In December 2016, the  Uganda National Roads Authority (UNRA) announced its intention to upgrade the gravel surfaced road to class II bitumen surface. The improvements are budgeted at US$40 million co-financed by the Arab Bank for Economic Development in Africa (BADEA) and the OPEC Fund for International Development (OFID), and are expected to last two years. UNRA sought parliamentary approval to borrow the required funds and received approval in December 2016.

In February 2017, BADEA and the government of Uganda signed loan agreements at BADEA's headquarters in Khartoum, for the funding portion of the road upgrade that BADEA has agreed to finance. Sidi Ould TAH, Director General of BADEA signed on behalf of BADEA and Matia Kasaija, Minister of Finance, Planning and Economic Development for the Republic of Uganda signed for Uganda.

In UNRA's end-of-year report for 2016/2017, which ended on 30 June 2017, this road is listed among those road projects at the "Feasibility study for road upgrading" stage.

See also
 Economy of Uganda
 Transport in Uganda
 List of roads in Uganda
 Uganda National Roads Authority

References

External links
 Uganda National Road Authority Homepage

Roads in Uganda
Luweero District
Nakaseke District
Central Region, Uganda